Thomas Edward George Hayhoe is a director of health sector organisations in the UK including West London NHS Trust where he is currently chairman, commentator on governance and organisation, a former businessman, student union politician and parliamentary candidate, and an offshore racing sailor.  He has lived in Hammersmith in West London since 1982.

Education 
Hayhoe's childhood was spent on the Isle of Portland, where he attended primary school before secondary education at Woodroffe Comprehensive School in Lyme Regis and St Paul's School in London. He studied history at Corpus Christi College, Cambridge achieving a double first, and received an MBA from the Stanford Graduate School of Business which he attended on a Harkness Fellowship.

Commercial career 
Hayhoe worked as a management consultant with McKinsey & Company before joining W H Smith as Head of Group Planning and Development and later working as a merchandise director in its main retail chain. He then worked with the Ashridge Strategic Management Centre and as an advisor to Coopers & Lybrand before establishing The Brackenbury Group in 1994 as a vehicle to provide management consultancy services and undertake management buy-ins.  This was subsequently expanded into retail and consumer consultancy The Chambers. In the mid 1990s he was a non-executive director of SLSS (Oyez Stationers). Between 2000 and 2002 he chaired the board of video games retailer Gamestation through a period of growth that took it from 26 to 70 outlets and negotiated its sale to Blockbuster.  In 2011 he was appointed strategy advisor at HRV Fit, developer of ithlete, the mobile heart rate variability application.

Healthcare 
Having studied health policy and economics with Professor Alain Enthoven while at Stanford, Hayhoe was invited in 1981 to join the group that developed health policy for the newly formed Social Democratic Party (SDP), and in 1985 was appointed to the first of a number of appointments as a lay member, non-executive director and finally deputy chairman of health authorities covering the boroughs of Ealing, Hammersmith and Fulham, and Hounslow in West London, serving until 2000.  He has since served as chairman of the West London Pathology Consortium (a collaboration between a number of acute hospitals in West London), chairman of the North West London sub-committee of the Advisory Committee for Clinical Excellence Awards, and as a director of MediHome Limited (a provider of out-of-hospital nursing and therapy services). Between 2005 and 2010 he served as chairman of Building Better Health West London (a Local Improvement Finance Trust company building community and primary care facilities for the NHS in West London).  He was appointed Chairman of West Middlesex University Hospital NHS Trust in October 2010 and a Trustee of Versus Arthritis (formerly Arthritis Research UK) in 2012. In 2015 he became Chairman of West London Mental Health NHS Trust (renamed West London NHS Trust in 2018) which is responsible for local inpatient and community mental health services in the London boroughs of Ealing, Hammersmith and Hounslow, for the Cassel Hospital, and for nationally commissioned high security psychiatric services including Broadmoor Hospital. He co-founded the Disabled NHS Directors Network in 2020 and served as its first chair.

Politics 

While at Cambridge he served as chairman of the university branch of the Tory Reform Group, was a member of the standing committee of the Cambridge Union Society, and following graduation served as president of Cambridge Students' Union.

Hayhoe was a research assistant and adviser to Conservative Party cabinet minister Peter Walker before joining the SDP in 1981 with seven other leading younger members of the Conservative Party, including Adair Turner and Anna Soubry.

At the 1987 general election he contested Wycombe as an SDP candidate.

Governance and organisation 
Hayhoe writes on governance, organisation, political economy and the theory of the firm.

Sailing 
Hayhoe has competed at national and international levels in a variety of dinghy, keelboat and offshore classes, including Firefly, 470, International 14, J/24, Laser, Laser 5000, Sigma 33, Prima 38, SB20 and Class 40, and currently races a National 12, a J/105 and a Waszp.   He is a former commodore of Ranelagh Sailing Club and Vice Commodore of the Royal Ocean Racing Club.  His wife, Natalie Jobling, served as a trustee of the Weymouth and Portland National Sailing Academy, the venue for the sailing events at the 2012 Olympic Games.

References

External links 
 West London NHS Trust
 Escondido Framework

Living people
1956 births
People from the Isle of Portland
People from Hammersmith
People educated at St Paul's School, London
Alumni of Corpus Christi College, Cambridge
Stanford Graduate School of Business alumni
Harkness Fellows
English businesspeople in retailing
Social Democratic Party (UK) parliamentary candidates
English male sailors (sport)
British management consultants
McKinsey & Company people